Angelo Orazi (born September 12, 1951) is an Italian professional football coach and a former player.

Career
Orazi began playing football with Roma, where he made his Serie A debut against Napoli on 23 February 1969. He played for 14 seasons (291 games, 19 goals) in the Serie A for A.S. Roma, Hellas Verona F.C., Delfino Pescara 1936, F.C. Catanzaro and Udinese Calcio.

A knee injury sustained in a collision with Luciano Re Cecconi prevented him from being selected as a candidate for the 1974 FIFA World Cup Italian squad.

Honours
 Coppa Italia winner: 1968/69.

References

1951 births
Living people
People from Spoleto
Italian footballers
Serie A players
A.S. Roma players
Hellas Verona F.C. players
Delfino Pescara 1936 players
U.S. Catanzaro 1929 players
Udinese Calcio players
Benevento Calcio players
Italian football managers
Ternana Calcio managers
Palermo F.C. managers
Ascoli Calcio 1898 F.C. managers
Footballers from Umbria
Association football midfielders
Sportspeople from the Province of Perugia